The Red Men Hall, listed as the Redmen's Hall, is a historic structure that houses a fraternal organization near the coast in the San Pedro community of Los Angeles, California.

Historic structure
Initially built as a library in 1915, the hall is a two-story American Craftsman style structure located on a hillside overlooking the Port of Los Angeles. The interior contains local wood paneling and exposed ceiling beams. The City designated the hall as a Los Angeles Historic-Cultural Monument (HCM #751) in 2003.

Fraternal organization
A local lodge of the Improved Order of Red Men, a fraternal organization which draws customs assumed to be used by Native American, has occupied the building for nearly all of its existence. Sequoia Tribe No. 140 remains active in their "San Pedro Wigwam" although the national organization has dwindled in membership.

See also
 Red Men Hall, for other buildings with the name in the United States
 List of Los Angeles Historic-Cultural Monuments in the Harbor area

References

External links
 Official San Pedro Wigwam website

Buildings and structures in Los Angeles
Clubhouses in California
San Pedro, Los Angeles
Buildings and structures completed in 1915
Los Angeles Historic-Cultural Monuments
Improved Order of Red Men
American Craftsman architecture in California